"Endless Winter" is a 2020 crossover event in DC Comics publications. Written by Andy Lanning and Ron Marz, the story follows the Frost King's efforts to cause an eternal global winter and the Justice League's efforts to stop him. The story appeared in nine issues spread across five comic titles published over five weeks in December 2020.

Publication history
DC first announced the storyline in July 2020. Initially planned to last two months as part of a major relaunch/rebranding effort by the publisher, by September it had been compressed to a five-week event. DC further advertised the story in a special 6-page section of their comics released on November 17.

The crossover was spread across nine issues of various comic book titles, beginning and ending with the two-issue limited series titled Justice League: Endless Winter. Additional chapters appeared in issues of the ongoing series Flash, Aquaman, Justice League, and Justice League Dark and in three one-shot specials focused on the characters of Superman, Teen Titans, and Black Adam. The comics were all released between December 1 and 29, 2020.

At a panel discussion during the October 2020 New York Comic Con, writer Ron Marz said the story came together around "Justice League Viking", a 10th-century version of the modern superhero team.

Plot
In the distant past, there was man name Edwald Olaffson who developed ice powers after saving his son from a polar bear attack in Greenland in the 10th century. Edwald was a metahuman who initially used his powers for good, however, not knowing how to control his powers, he accidentally brought cold weather which caused famine and less exposure to the sun which caused his villagers to mistrust him and be angered. The villagers tried attacking Edwald but he fought back. During the chaos, his son was killed and Edwald grew angry to the point where his village was completely encased in ice and became a being known as the Frost King. In the 10th Century, Hippolyta, Swamp Thing, and the Viking Prince had freed Black Adam in the past to deal with the Frost King when his magic nearly destroyed the world. Black Adam found out Frost King's true identity and used his family as bait to distract the Frost King, but the Frost King accidentally kills his family and escaped Hippolyta to go in hiding. The Justice League (Batman, Superman, Wonder Woman, Flash, Green Lantern, Martian Manhunter, and Aquaman) thwarts a villainous plan devised by Multiplex, Icicle, and Catman to rob a bank. Meanwhile in Greenland, Simon Stagg's son Sebastian Stagg discovers a new ice strain which can achieve cold fusion. The workers on the Snow Crawler inform Sebastian that a great storm is going to hit them in an hour and he orders them to pick up the pace despite their reluctance. Flash and Superman talk about their personal lives, specifically Iris West, Superman's son and public identity while running over the Atlantic Ocean. Superman has to leave to go to Sri Lanka because there's trouble, and Flash goes talk to Black Lightning in Metropolis to talk about how Black Lightning balances his superhero life with family. Meanwhile, Sebastian Stagg's workers get attacked by ice wolves in the Snow Crawler. The Justice League arrives to help deal with the ice beings, but suddenly a being named Frost King comes out of the Snow Crawler and attacks the heroes causing a huge explosion.

Flash runs around the world trying to help everyone while the other heroes deal with the Frost King's monsters in different cities and no one has heard from Aquaman yet. Flash passes out after being ambushed by the ice monsters, but Black Adam rescues him and Flash saves Iris West from ice monsters.

In the present, Jimmy Olsen and Lois Lane are about to be killed by some ice monsters on top of the Daily Planet when Superman saves them. After making sure they're safe, Superman goes out to help people and is soon overwhelmed by the ice monsters. Superman flies off to his hometown Smallville to save Krypto and his adopted parents Jonathan and Martha Kent. After getting a reassuring pep talk from them, Superman leaves to help more people. Back in Metropolis, Lois writes an article for the people of Metropolis, inspiring them not to lose hope, even during these harsh times. Meanwhile in Gotham City, Sebastian Stagg and his research team are still trying to uncover the secrets of the ice sample that Stagg Enterprises took from the Arctic Circle. They have discovered that the ice contains Kryptonian crystals and a mysterious energy signature. They have also discovered that there are people buried underneath the ice and they are still alive.

In the present day, Aquaman, Mera and their daughter go to Amnesty Bay to deal with the ice monsters in Atlantis to persuade the Fire Trolls to help them 

John Stewart helps out civilians before going to Washington D.C to meet with Detective Chimp when he's attacked by the Frost King, but the Justice League saves him. The Frost King realizes that the thing he is trying to find (the preservation of his family) is in Stagg Industries Research Facility in Gotham.

Meanwhile, the Teen Titans allow kids to stay in their Titans Tower to wait out the snowstorm. The Teen Titans decide to go to Brooklyn to deal with ice monsters and help a sleeping metahuman name Summer Zahid deal with an ice monster. While recovering, Flash, Cyborg, and Starfire teleport in the Titan Tower using a Boom Tube to check on the heroes. Donna Troy realizes the Frost King is the story that Hippolyta told her when she was in Themiscyra and tells Cyborg to teleport her and Flash there to help the Amazons.

Zatanna tells Wonder Woman that they need to go to New Myria to find where the current Swamp Thing is. They find Swamp Thing, but Swamp Thing says his powers are weakening due to the Frost King's powers. Back on Earth, Queen Hippolyta summons the spirit of the Viking Prince for help, and the Viking Prince explains that they need to find Frost King's family to find Frost King. Wonder Woman and Zatanna arrive holding an empty vessel of the Swamp Thing. The vessel possesses the Viking Prince, turning him into the new Swamp Thing.

Silver Banshee, Icicle, Catman, Rampage, Black Adam, and the Frost King arrive at the Stagg Enterprises facility to take the frozen Frost King's family who is in stasis right now. Multiplex tries helping Black Adam, but he over exhausts himself and Frost King kills Multiplex. Black Adam threatens to kill Frost King's family. While Frost King is distracted, Sebastian Stagg sends out a robot that can fire cold fusion cannons, but it makes the Frost King stronger instead. Just before Black Adam is killed, Superman, Wonder Woman, Flash, Batman, and Green Lantern arrive.

Batman reveals that he let Sebastian Stagg be used as bait to find the Frost King, the heroes start fighting against him. The Viking Prince/Swamp Thing arrives in battle and realizes this is just an avatar of the Frost King. Batman and Hippolyta find the Frost King's true body in the Fortress of Solitude where it was revealed that in the past, Edwald was trapped in the Fortress of Solitude. Once Sebastian Stagg indirectly freed him, he absorbed the powers of the Fortress of Solitude to create avatars and wreak havoc. Black Adam nearly kills Frost King, but Superman stops him and they both fight while the Frost King regains his strength. Aquaman arrives with the Fire Trolls to help turn the tide. Hippolyta and Wonder Woman nearly convinced the Frost King, but his avatar starts raging out of control and causing chaos across the battlefield. There is a huge explosion and the Frost King and his horde are seemingly destroyed. Black Adam leaves while swearing vengeance on Superman, and the rest of the world celebrates the Justice League's heroics. Sebastian Stagg is arrested for his crimes, The Viking Prince returns to the afterlife while the Swamp Thing finds another avatar, and Superman starts rebuilding the Fortress of Solitude. It's revealed that the Frost King is still alive, and he decides to go into cyrostasis until his family is freed once more.

Critical reception
The story received positive reviews from critics for its action and art style, but there was criticism of the underdeveloped plot. According to review aggregator Comic Book Roundup, the crossover received a score of 7.7 out of 10 based on 52 reviews.

The second chapter appeared in The Flash #767. Bleeding Cool criticized it for not revealing new information nor moving the plot along, and found it lackluster compared to previous work by the writers and art team.

Collected edition

References

Justice League storylines